Sunia Koto Vuli (born 15 April 1980 in Suva) is a Fijian rugby union player. He plays as a hooker.

He played for the Fijian teams Highlanders, and Fiji Warriors, London Welsh in England, and currently Narbonne.

He played his first game for Fiji, on 3 June 2005, against New Zealand Māori. He was a member of his country's squad at the 2007 Rugby World Cup finals, playing in four games.

Koto had 18 caps for his side by the end of the competition.

References

External links
 Narbonne profile
 Fiji profile
 Scrum profile

1980 births
Living people
People educated at Marist Brothers High School, Fiji
Fijian rugby union players
Rugby union hookers
Sportspeople from Suva
Fiji international rugby union players
Pacific Islanders rugby union players
Fijian expatriate rugby union players
Expatriate rugby union players in New Zealand
Expatriate rugby union players in England
Expatriate rugby union players in France
Fijian expatriate sportspeople in New Zealand
Fijian expatriate sportspeople in France
Fijian expatriate sportspeople in England
London Welsh RFC players
I-Taukei Fijian people